Ravenswood is an eastern suburb of Launceston, Tasmania, Australia.

History

Ravenswood was first settled in the early nineteenth century as a small farming area. The first official valuation of properties in the district took place in 1858.

For some years after the arrival of the pioneers, there was only one road to Launceston across a ford at St. Leonards. There were no bridges. The farmers went by horseback to Launceston to sell their fruit, butter, eggs and vegetables.

There is very little about the area indexed at the Archives Office in Tasmania, but what information there is supports the claim that the Ravenswood district took its name from the property owned by David McGown on Distillery Creek.

As well as already obtaining grants of land from the Government, Mr McGown purchased 2000 acres and another 30 acres at Distillery Creek from Henry Prialux, the original grantee, in February, 1836, for the sum of two thousand pounds. He called his property at Distillery Creek "Ravenswood". Later he named the area near his home "Roslyn". His first home on the property was, unfortunately, burnt. Ultimately the district became known as Ravenswood.

In 1838, Mr. McGown stated evidence to the Distillation Committee that he had carried on business as a Distiller for 14 years in Scotland and for 6 years in the colony at the site, Distillery Creek.

On 19 May 1838, the Cornwall Chronicle carried a warning to trespassers not to allow cattle on the property of "Ravenswood", the property of D. McGown (known as Priaulx's grant).

It was in 1840, according to the Cornwall Chronicle that he offered "Ravenswood" and the "Caledonian Will" for sale.

In 1858 and 1868 the assessment rolls showed John Faulkner as occupier of the house with garden and land owned by D. McGown's trustees, agent - James Scott.

"Distillery Creek" received its name for an obvious reason. The Caledonian Distillery, sometimes known as Towers' Distillery, was built on Mr. McGown's property and was conducted by his brother - in - law, James Towers, whose brother, Robert, operated the semaphore station at Windmill Hill.

Nearby settlers used to bring their grain to the mill. They received in return bottles of whiskey which were passed to them through spaces between horizontal bars firmly set in wall openings. The water used for distilling was piped from a spring in the hills above.

On the opposite side of Distillery Creek near the site of the home of Mr and Mrs D. Brooks, there was once a flour mill called Harden Mill, built in 1857 to the order of James Scott, the surveyor and son-in-law of D. McGown. He lived in "Bowhill", Glen Dhu, behind Coats Patons' Mill. In 1868 Gaunt and Co. were occupiers and James Scott was still owner.

By 1892 James Marshall was the operator. An illustration of "Marshall's Mill" may be found in records in the local history room at the Northern Regional Library. Later it was sold to Robert Hogarth. Finally, in 1932, it was demolished because there were large cracks in the walls and it was considered unsafe.

An early map shows four adjoining properties owned by Jame McNally, Francis Bourke, Richard Dry and Dalrymple Keating. These properties were purchased on 31 July 1883, by Ameia Dean, wife of George B. Dean owner of the Phoenix Bakery, St John Street, Launceston. The farm "Hiawatha Farm", was first used as a run for horses which drew the bread delivery carts. The farm extended to what we now know as Ravenswood Road. Gradually, small sections have been sold to make way for Launceston City Council initiated developments, e.g. flood prevention, a section of Bell Bay railway, housing and the present school.

In December, 1914, an agreement was drawn up between Amelia Dean and a solicitor, Louis Page, to have a bridge built across the North Esk River at Henry Street. Louise Page was to have the bridge built in return for 20 acres of land from Amelia Dean. The conditions were that the bridge had to be above the level of the highest flood, (it withstood the flood of 1929), that it be completed in nine months and that it be substantial enough to bear the weight of traction engines and other machinery. Roads approaching it were to be completed in twelve months. The bridge was replaced by the Launceston City Council in 1968.

Another bridge, the first, was built by George Hobler, who had land at South Ravenswood, bound by the North Esk. He obtained permission from the Government to build a bridge over the river at his own expense. This was the first Hobler's bridge. George's property was known as "Killafaddy". Since then, two more bridges of the same name have been built and each has been in a different place.

According to one source, two of the best known early settlers were the Towse brothers, who emigrated from England. It has been suggested that their property was named "Ravenswood", after their property in their homeland but Archives did not reveal any evidence to substantiate this. Their first home was built of stone. A small church was built on the corner of Wildor Crescent and Henry Street (now demolished). The Towse brothers were buried in the cemetery nearby. Other tombstones bear the names of Faulkner, Gipton, Elmore and Hodgson.

Timber split in the bush and hauled by bullocks was used to build a small hall on Mr. Gipton's property. The renovated building, now the Ravenswood Gospel Chapel is in front of the original Gipton house.

Quite a few of the early homes, like Mr. Gipton's, were made of large blocks of stone. At one time there were six such homes facing Launceston. Mr Bird and Mr Tattersall both lived in stone houses near the recreation ground and Mr S. Leslie lived in another near the reservoir.

Names of other early settlers not mentioned elsewhere are Boag, Luck, Lawrence, Goodyer, Rankin, Olding, Bradshaw, Chandler. Land holders shown on an early map were Kealing, Dry, Burke, McNalley, Stonehouse, Mackey, E. Wench, Snell, whose holdings were "located". D. McGown, C. Swan, H. Chapman, T. Learmonth and H. Jennings were "granted" land.

The first school was built on land given by Robert Gipton, who migrated from Ireland, he married Miss Towse. The building of the first school consisted of one school room with an attached residence of four rooms and a sun room. The structure was at the rear of Mr Spataro's house in Henry Street.

Children came from as far as Rocherlea, Mowbray, Vermont, Prosser's Forest and Russell's Plains, Waverley and Newstead. The enrolment at one time reached 60. The school was closed in 1940 because of diminishing numbers. Mr R. K. Jones was the last principal. The building itself was re-erected at Ogilvie Park where it serves as a caretakers residence. The flag which was used at the first school in Ravenswood was donated to the present primary school by Mrs R. K. Jones.

Facilities
Ravenswood has the following facilities:
Two shopping centres
Police station
Volunteer Fire Station
Skate park
Hotel
Over 50's club
Community health centre
Community centre
Pharmacy
Library
Bakery
Neighbourhood house
Newsagent
Church
IGA Supermarket 
Bowls club
Op Shop
Bike Museum
Mamas CAF

Education
Ravenswood's population expanded rapidly in the 1970s and in 1976 a high school opened under the Principal Peter Brooker.  The school population peaked in 1979 - 1984 when around 700 students from grades 7 to 10 attended the first open plan high school in Tasmania.  Over the years the school population declined and by the early 1990s the High School was considered for amalgamation.  Ravenswood now has two schools, including Ravenswood Heights which formed at the end of the 1996 school year after the amalgamation of the three local schools Ravenswood High, Ravenswood Primary and East Ravenswood Primary. After the amalgamation Ravenswood Primary was closed and later re-opened as a special school. While Ravenswood High became the senior campus for grades 6-10 with East Ravenswood becoming the junior campus for grades 1-5 as well as having a kindergarten. The senior campus closed at the end of 1999 after many years of low enrolments, leaving remaining students to choose between nearby Brooks High School at Rocherlea or Queechy High School at Norwood.

References

Suburbs of Launceston, Tasmania
Localities of City of Launceston